Valeria Solarino (born 4 November 1979) is an Italian actress, born in Venezuela.

Life and career 
She was born in Barcelona, Venezuela to a Sicilian father and Turinese mother. After studying philosophy at the University of Turin, she debuted as actress in the Teatro Stabile.

In 2003 she was chosen by director Mimmo Calopresti for a small role in Happiness Costs Nothing (2003), after which her career took off: in the same year she played Maja in the Fame chimica (Chemical Hunger) by Paolo Vari and Antonio Bocola and Bea in What Will Happen to Us by Giovanni Veronesi, who is her current partner.

In 2005 Solarino starred in La febbre by Alessandro D'Alatri, in 2006 in Viaggio segreto  by Roberto Andò and, in 2007, Valzer by Salvatore Maira. In 2009 she played the role of a lesbian lover in Viola di mare (Sea Purple), a historical film by Donatella Maiorca. which was shown at the Rome Film Festival.

In 2018, she starred as the psychologist Anna in As Needed, directed by Francesco Falaschi.

References

External links

 Valeria Solarino - Interview (Italian)
 Valeria Solarino at La Repubblica (Italian)

1978 births
Living people
Italian film actresses
Italian television actresses
21st-century Italian actresses
People from Barcelona, Venezuela
People of Sicilian descent
People of Piedmontese descent